The 1938 Chattanooga Moccasins football team was an American football team that represented the University of Chattanooga (now known as the University of Tennessee at Chattanooga) in the Dixie Conference during the 1938 college football season. In its eighth year under head coach Scrappy Moore, the team compiled a 4–5 record.

Schedule

References

Chattanooga
Chattanooga Mocs football seasons
Chattanooga Moccasins football